Ballygall is a small suburban area located between Glasnevin and Finglas, on the northside of the city of Dublin, Ireland. It is also a townland divided between the civil parish of Finglas and that of Glasnevin. It was settled by Vikings in the 11th century, and later by the Cambro-Normans.

The area is largely residential, with St Kevin's College, some shops, and a church and schools.

Etymology
The Cambro-Normans called it Fyngallestoun, the township of Fingal, but the indigenous Gaels called it the town of the Galls, or foreigners, hence in Gaelic, Baile na nGall. Whether from the Normans or the Gaels, it was abbreviated later in old charters to Gallstoun. It seems to have been originally settled by a man called Arthur, hence it appears also as Arthurstoun. It seems to have morphed from Gallstoun to Ballygall sometime in the 16th century. There are many similarly-named denominations in the archives of the Registry of Deeds.

History
A place called Arthureston is mentioned explicitly as a manor in the Chancery Rolls of Ireland in several places under several entries during the reign of King Edward III in the 14th century. A very specific reference to Fyngaleston relates to Cristofor de Preston. It is also mentioned in the Calendar of the Gormanstown Register as a manor, and was the original seat of the Prestons, the principal landholders of Fingal, before they moved to and became lords and later Viscounts of Gormanston. It was granted in 1318 as a Manor to William de Prestoun:

A quit-claim of 1334 in the Gormanston Register also refers: Quit-claim of Arthurestoun, which is called Fyngallestoun. Hugh de Lacy, knight, has for ever released to William de Prestoun, burgess of Drogheda, all his right and claim.

Fyngalleston was the first royal grant made to the Prestons in Ireland, for laudable services, an honour. It was previously a knight’s property, with associated demesnes and lordships. It may in fact be the only manorial title which the Prestons held originally directly from the Crown (as distinct from those to which they succeeded from others). It was therefore held as tenants-in-chief, and as their initial principal manor. Although the Prestons later disposed of the lands, the lordship of the manor was not alienated, and remained with the Prestons under reversion, and passed eventually to a resident of Ballygall. At the time in 1363 when the lands were being disposed, Robert de Prestoun was deeply involved in the acquisition of the more substantial Manor of Gormanston. In fact Gormanston was acquired in the same year as the lands at Fyngallestoun were disposed. It is not known exactly when the manor of Fyngallestoun ceased to function as a manor (with courts leet and baron), but it is likely that it ceased when the Prestons moved from Fyngallestoun to Gormanston c. 1363, which then became their chief manor (and for which extensive records of manorial courts exist still in the ownership and custody of Viscount Gormanston).  The shift in nomenclature of Fyngallestoun/Gallstoun to Ballygall probably occurred in the 16th century.

Historically, a large part of the original townland of Ballygall belonged to the Ball family.  Margaret Bermingham (1515-1584) married Bartholomew Ball, a prosperous merchant who held houses in Ballygall and Merchants’ Quay. Their manor house Ballygall House was built in the early 16th century, most likely on the site of the old Manor of Fyngallestoun, and was located where the modern housing estate now called Hillcrest Park is located. Ballygall House was located between the present houses numbered 10-60 in Hillcrest Park,  its demesne extending to Glasnevin Avenue. The Ballygall estate which belonged to the Ball family in the 16th century was used for agricultural purposes right up to 1964 when the last owners, the Craigie family of Merville Dairy in Finglas, sold it for housing development.

Margaret Ball (the former Margaret Bermingham) maintained a Catholic household at Ballygall House where she gave refuge to Catholic clergy and provided education to the children of Catholic families despite being prohibited to do so by Penal Laws. Imprisoned by her son, Walter Ball (d. 1598), who conformed to the established (Anglican) church and who became Mayor of Dublin in 1577, she died in 1584 in Dublin Castle.  In September 1992 Pope John Paul II beatified Margaret Ball along with 16 other martyrs who had died at the hands of English authorities in Ireland due to their unwillingness to accept the Protestant faith. She is Secondary Patroness of the Roman Catholic Parish of Ballygall, which includes an oratory to her memory.

Location
Ballygall lies within the southern part of ancient Fingal, although the modern county of the same name has its southern boundary a bit further north. Its centre is about 2 km from the centre of Glasnevin and 3 km from central Finglas. Ballygall is divided between the barony of Castleknock to the west and the barony of Coolock to the east. Ballygall lies between the villages of Finglas and Glasnevin, and the old parish, now large suburban district, of Ballymun.

Within the area of Fingal, a location identified as “Gallenstown” appears in the map of County Dublin drawn by Sir William Petty in the 17th century. Ballygall (Gallstown in Gaelic is Baile na nGall, anglicised Ballygall) is a modern parish between Finglas and Santry in old Fingal, and is referred to as Ballygals or Ballygales in the Civil Survey of 1654. The Civil Survey relates properties in very close proximity in the Finglas-Santry axis: Finglas (p. 143); Barnewall’s farm "south with ye lane leading from Ffinglas to Ballygals, west to Arthur’s land, north to Jamestown', [etc.]”. This area comprising Finglas, Ballygall, and through Santry to the coast near Howth, just north of Dublin would have been the original heartland of Fingal, “land of the foreigners” from which they gradually spread north along the coast and inland, hence the original denomination of Fyngallestoun. The neighbouring Manor of Glasnevin is now the Holy Faith Convent.

Boundaries
The portion of the townland in the parish of Finglas covers the areas of Ballygall Road East, Hillcrest, Benevin and parts of Glasnevin Avenue to the north with Saint Kevin's College on the southern boundary. The portion of the townland in the Civil Parish of Glasnevin covers the area from Ballygall Road East in front of the Church of the Our Mother of Divine Grace and the western portion of St. Canices Road and Wadelai estate

Religion
Ballygall is a parish in the Fingal South West deanery of the Roman Catholic Archdiocese of Dublin, served by the Church of Our Mother of Divine Grace. Centred on the townland of Ballygall, it was constituted in 1964 from Glasnevin, and its boundaries also include other townlands such as Johnstown, Tolka, Walnut Grove and Wadeli.

Community and voluntary sector
The Catholic parish hosts a unit of the Order of Malta Ambulance Corps and its cadets.

Notable people from Ballygall
Blessed Margaret Ball (1514–1584), Irish martyr
Walter Ball (d.1598), Mayor of Dublin, co-founder of Trinity College Dublin
Patrick Cosgrave (1941–2001), journalist, writer and special advisor to Margaret Thatcher
Marian Finucane, broadcaster
Gavin Friday, songwriter/performer (1959-)
Teresa Mannion,  TV broadcaster and news reporter.
Jim McQuaid, leading racing cyclist and later national coach
Paddy McQuaid, cyclist, later president of the national cycling federation
Pat McQuaid, racing cyclist, later president of the national cycling federation and the world governing body
Colm Meaney (1953- ), actor
Francis Martin O'Donnell (1954- ), ambassador, Knight of Malta, diplomat, historian
James O'Higgins Norman, academic and author.
David O'Leary (1958- ), Irish soccer international footballer
Barney Rock, Dublin County footballer 1979-1991
Linda Gorman, Ireland women's soccer team and manager

References

 
Townlands of County Dublin